OMFG may refer to:

 OpenMFG, a business software package
 Oh My Fucking God, an exclamation abbreviated as OMFG in SMS language
 "OMFG", a song by Deluka
 "OMFG", a song by Lil Peep from Hellboy, 2016

See also 
 OMG (disambiguation)
 Oh My God (disambiguation)